Joseph Robbins may refer to:

 Joseph E. Robbins (1901–1989), American film technician
 Joe Robbins (footballer), English footballer
 Joseph Robbins (priest), Anglican priest in Ireland